Abdul-Wahid Shannan ar-Ribat (Arabic: عبد الواحد شنان آل رباط) is a former Iraqi Army general.

Ribat, a Shiite, is from the city of Samawah in Muthanna province. He served as Chief of Staff of the Iraqi Army during the reign of Saddam Hussein.

He later went on to become the Governor of Nineveh in 1999, in which capacity he served until the 2003 invasion of Iraq.

Reported death
On 14 June 2014 an Iraqi government spokesperson claimed Ribat was killed in a government airstrike on Mosul as part of the 2014 Northern Iraq Offensive. Ribat's family however refuted this, and claimed that he was alive and well in the United Arab Emirates, and had no contact with militant groups active in Iraq.

Prosecution of British government ministers 
In 2016, he launched a private prosecution of the British Prime Minister, Tony Blair, at the time of the invasion of Iraq, as well as the Foreign Secretary, Jack Straw, and the Attorney General, Lord Goldsmith. He alleged that they had committed the crime of aggression by invading Iraq and based his evidence, in part, on the Chilcot Inquiry report. He was represented by Michael Mansfield, QC, a prominent lawyer. His attempt to have the defendants arrested was dismissed by a District Judge at Westminster Magistrates Court in November 2016, but this has been appealed. The current Attorney General has intervened in the case to argue against. In July 2017, the London High Court ruled the prosecution had failed for three reasons:  (1) In 2006, the Law Lords had ruled that the crime of aggression is in fact not a crime in England and Wales; (2) The accused had governmental immunity at the time of their actions; (3) Ar-Ribat had not obtained the permission of the sitting UK Attorney General.

References

Governors of Nineveh Governorate
Living people
Iraqi military personnel
People from Samawah
1944 births